Tony Huntson (also spelled Hunston) was an Irish footballer who played for Brooklyn F.C. As an international he also played for the Irish Free State.

Career
Huntson is listed as having scored one goal for Brooklyn in the 1923–24 season. He made his international debut for the Irish Free State on 16 June 1924 in a friendly against the United States. This game would be the Irish Free State's first-ever international match on home turf. A crowd of just under 4,000 spectators at Dalymount Park witnessed Ed Brooks score a hattrick in a 3–1 win for the home side. This would be Huntson's only cap for Ireland at senior level.

References

League of Ireland players
Irish Olympic Council international footballers
Irish Free State association footballers
Year of birth missing
Year of death missing
Association footballers not categorized by position
Association football players not categorized by nationality